The locality and suburb of Gymea Bay are located in southern Sydney, in the state of New South Wales, Australia. The postcode is 2227, which it shares with the adjacent suburb of Gymea. The Gymea Bay locality takes its name from the adjoining Gymea Bay, a small bay on the north side of the Port Hacking estuary).

The locality includes only the single peninsula between Gymea Bay and the North West Arm of the Port Hacking River, bounded by Coonong Creek on the north and, on the west, by an unnamed creek flowing south of Gymea Bay Road between Barraran Street and Coonong Road. Gymea Bay became a locality within the suburb of Gymea. Early street directories show the locality of Gymea Bay as part of the suburb of Gymea.

In 2008, the NSW Geographical Names Board suggested a much enlarged area for a suburb of Gymea Bay, taking in much of former Gymea, north of Coonong Creek, and even part of the suburb of Miranda which are separated from the original locality of Gymea Bay and its settlement by a deep valley with no roads. This suggested new suburb's extremities are defined by Forest Road on the northeast, Avenel Road on the north, Dents Creek on the west, and the waters of North West Arm and the bay itself to the south. These suggested boundaries remain contentious as the proposal to the NSW Geographical Names Board required community consultation.

The locality was characterised by large amounts of verdant bushland. However, since the 1980s, increased subdivision with smaller lots, larger houses and increased motor vehicle ownership has decreased the number of large trees. Despite Tree Preservation Orders and Council Greenweb and Greenweb Support planning zones, much of the treescape has been lost. Since the 1990s, invasions of feral deer from the Royal National Park have begun to negatively affect shrub and ground cover and regrowth of trees.

Origin of name
"Gymea" was the local Eora people's name for the Gymea Lily Doryanthes excelsa, a tall (up to 6m) perennial plant. In 1855, the NSW government surveyor, W.A.B. Geaves named the area Gymea after the plants which were prevalent in the area. The Gymea Lily has been adopted as a symbol of the area and features on the crest of many local organisations. Development in the area has eradicated most of these lilies in the locality and suburb but they can still be found across the Port Hacking River in the Royal National Park.

History
The local Dharawal people hunted, fished and gathered food and materials over the area but there appears to be no sites of settlement with more suitable sites nearby. There are Aboriginal rock markings and middens at the headlands of the North West Arm of Port Hacking.

The settlement at Gymea Bay grew around the transport access to the Port Hacking River. With the opening of a railway line from Sydney to Sutherland in 1885, carts and coaches could reach Gymea Bay as the closest point on the Port Hacking River by relatively easy grades. Gymea Bay Road originally led all the way to the shore of Gymea Bay where a wharf and boat shed developed and mail and supplies were taken by boat to houses along the Port Hacking River. With the operation of the Sutherland to Cronulla tramway from 1911 to 1931 and the Sutherland to Cronulla railway with Gymea railway station opening in 1939, Gymea Bay developed from a rural area into a recreation and holiday area with fishing shacks and holiday homes. Boats could be hired at the boatshed. By the 1920s a coach depot was built on what is now the reserve and playground at the intersection of Gymea Bay Road and Sylvania Road South (now Casuarina Road). A general store was operated by Mr. & Mrs. Jarvis from 1921 and Post Office opened. Electricity arrived in 1926. Church of England services were held at private homes from 1927 and a church hall, St. Barnabus Church, was built at 276a Gymea Bay Road and held its first service in March 1929. A progress association, now Gymea Bay Community Association, was formed and a community hall was built on Sylvania Road South (now 26 Greygum Place). Tank water gave way to reticulated water supply from the 1930s. Gymea Bay Public School opened in August 1935 with 65 students at what was then the fringe of the settlement, on the site of the current Old School Park. Another general store, churches, a joinery factory, a playground, tennis courts at Sylvania Road South (now 5-7 Casuarina Road) and later a butcher's shop all developed at or near the intersection of Gymea Bay Road and Sylvania Road South (now Casuarina Road). Gymea Bay Baths were built and Gymea Bay Amateur Swimming Club developed as did a short lived sailing club and club boatshed on the shore opposite the baths. Kemp's Cosy Cabins and Caravan Park operated on the south of the peninsula with cabins and camping sites from Ellesmere Road to the North West Arm of the Port Hacking River where it had a large two-storey sandstone boatshed and function hall. Another tennis court was built at 250 Gymea Bay Road. A petrol service station opened at 237 Gymea Bay Road, opposite Vernon Avenue, and a much larger bus depot was built at 227 Gymea Bay Road.

Aerial photographs of the 1930 and 1955 show the original Gymea Bay settlement.

The Gymea Bay locality and community lost much of their identity beginning in 1955 when the public school was moved to a new site further up Gymea Bay Road to a new subdivision, beyond the boundary of Gymea Bay. The Council moved the community hall from Sylvania Road (now 26 Greygum Place) near the intersection of Gymea Bay Road to the new reserve and oval, beyond the boundary of Gymea Bay. Gymea Bay Boy Scouts had opened in 1957 in a former school building at the old school site before moving the building to a new subdivision in June Place next to the oval. Private land line telephones were connected in the early 1960s and queues and impromptu meetings of neighbours at the public telephone boxes ceased. By the 1970s the church at 239-241 Gymea Bay had closed and St. Barnabus, Church of England was the only remaining church, the joinery factory closed, and the shops began to decline, Wagner's general store and cake shop at 280 Gymea Bay Road closed and its shopfront was demolished, Kemp's Cosy Cabins and Caravan Park closed and was subdivided for the housing of Flat Rock Road. Miss Cook's general store built new premises, demolished the old store and rebuilt then continued under new ownership, later the Post Office and butchers shop and St. Barnabus Church of England closed and, after some years, became a Council children's centre, the bus depot ceased operation and eventually the service station closed. The boatshed closed when the Council refused to allow it to operate a cafe to support it financially. The public telephone boxes were gradually removed and, following the advent of mobile phones, disappeared completely. The old school site was vacant for decades and earmarked for sale for housing development before being developed as a park with playground.

In 2008 the Gymea Bay locality and community lost almost all of what remained of their identity when Sutherland Shire Council nominated a much larger area as the suburb of Gymea Bay, including much of former Gymea, north of Coonong Creek, and even part of the suburb of Miranda which are separated from the original locality and community of Gymea Bay by a deep valley with no roads.

Population
In the 2016 census, there were 6,892 residents in Gymea Bay. The most common ancestries were English 30.4%, Australian 29.1%, Irish 10.3%, Scottish 8.0% and Italian 2.9%.  83.7% of people were born in Australia. The next most common country of birth was England at 4.0%. 90.4% of people spoke only English at home. The most common responses for religion were Catholic 28.3%, Anglican 25.4% and No Religion 25.0%. The median household weekly income of $2,523 was substantially higher than the national figure of $1,438.

Notable people

 Eora people: traditional custodians of the land
 Hon. Mark Speakman: local member for parliament

Commercial area
The suburb of Gymea Bay is mostly residential, with a small group of shops located in Casuarina Road near the intersection of Gymea Bay Road. The suburb's needs are principally served by shops in neighbouring suburbs, especially Gymea and Miranda.

Schools
Gymea Bay Public School is located on Gymea Bay Road. Gymea Bay Public School became the largest primary school (by number of students) in the Sutherland Shire.

Recreation
Gymea Bay is home to the heritage Gymea Bay Baths, at the shore of Gymea Bay Baths Reserve at the intersection of Gymea Bay Road and Ellesmere Road. Gymea Bay Amateur Swimming Club has been using the baths for over 40 years. The bay and Port Hacking estuary are used extensively for recreation and fishing.

Coonong Creek Bushland Reserve
Coonong Creek Bushland Reserve in Gymea Bay is a remnant bushland area maintained by Sutherland Shire Council and volunteers. Its walking tracks link with the Old School Park and Gymea Bay Baths Reserve.

How Alkaringa Road, Miranda was changed to be part of Gymea Bay
A prominent local real estate agent who resided in Alkaringa Road, Miranda, recognising the effect of "snob factor" on property values, began a campaign to have Alkaringa Road, Miranda re-identified as part of adjoining Yowie Bay or Gymea Bay. One nonsense argument was that Alkaringa Road residents' children went to Gymea Bay Public School. A few waterfront properties at the southern end of Alkaringa Road front onto Gymea Bay but then, many properties in the suburb of Yowie Bay face and even front onto Gymea Bay. Sutherland Shire Council, also recognising the effect on property values and its consequent rate income, nominated huge changes to the established locality, making much of Gymea, north of Coonong Creek, and Alkaringa Road, Miranda as part of the suburb of Gymea Bay.

References

External links 

 Gymea Bay Public School
 
 Heritage listing of Gymea Bay baths
 Gymea Bay Swimming Club

Suburbs of Sydney
Sutherland Shire